Parasynema is a genus of spiders in the family Thomisidae. It was first described in 1900 by F. O. Pickard-Cambridge. , it contains 2 species.

References

Thomisidae
Araneomorphae genera
Spiders of Mexico
Spiders of Central America